The 1966 USA Outdoor Track and Field Championships men's competition took place between June 25-26 at Downing Stadium on Randalls Island in New York City, New York. The women's division held their championships separately in Frederick, Maryland.  Both venues were dirt tracks.

The Marathon championships were run in October at the Yonkers Marathon for the final time after being designated the National Championships 18 times in succession.

Jim Ryun was the star of the show, running the first four minute mile in the northeastern United States.

Results

Men track events

Men field events

Toomey's world record, a 4 point improvement over Hodge's existing record, was never ratified

Women track events

Women field events

See also
United States Olympic Trials (track and field)

References

 Results from T&FN
 results

USA Outdoor Track and Field Championships
Usa Outdoor Track And Field Championships, 1966
Track and field
Track and field in New York (state)
USA Outdoor Track and Field Championships
USA Outdoor Track and Field Championships
Sports in New York (state)
Track and field in Maryland
USA Outdoor Track and Field Championships
Sports in Maryland